The 2019–20 Morgan State Bears men's basketball team represent Morgan State University in the 2019–20 NCAA Division I men's basketball season. The Bears, led by 1st-year head coach Kevin Broadus, play their home games at Talmadge L. Hill Field House in Baltimore, Maryland as members of the Mid-Eastern Athletic Conference.

Previous season
The Bears finished the 2018–19 season 9–21 overall, 4–12 in MEAC play, finishing in 11th place. In the MEAC tournament, they were defeated in the quarterfinals by Coppin State.

On March 19, 2019, it was announced that head coach Todd Bozeman's contract would not be renewed, ending his 13-year tenure with the team. On May 1, Kevin Broadus, an assistant head coach at Maryland, was announced as the team's next head coach.

Roster

Schedule and results

|-
!colspan=12 style=| Non-conference regular season

|-
!colspan=9 style=| MEAC regular season

|-
!colspan=12 style=| MEAC tournament
|-

|-

Source

References

Morgan State Bears men's basketball seasons
Morgan State Bears
Morgan State Bears men's basketball
Morgan State Bears men's basketball